Dutton Park Place busway station is located in Brisbane, Australia serving the suburb of Dutton Park. It is the penultimate westbound stop on the Eastern Busway.

Situated on the eastern bank of the Brisbane River at the end of the Eleanor Schonell Bridge, and connects the busway to the University of Queensland via its busway station opposite the river. Passengers can access the station from TJ Doyle Memorial Park Drive, near the South Brisbane Cemetery, while buses can enter and exit the station independently of the Eastern Busway at the Annerley Road-Gladstone Road intersection.

History
Although the Bridge was constructed in 2006, the bus stop on its eastern end at Dutton Park Place was only opened on 3 August 2009, as part of the Boggo Road Busway connecting UQ Lakes to Buranda. Before opening, the proximity of the Dutton Park bus station construction works to the South Brisbane Cemetery was somewhat controversial, prompting concern from Prime Minister Kevin Rudd.

The bus stop acts as an important component of the environmentally friendly nature of the attached Eleanor Schonell Bridge. It provides busway access to pedestrians and cyclists, and connects to Brisbane's lengthy bikeway network.

Routes

Dutton Park Place is serviced by six TransLink routes, all of which terminate at the adjacent UQ Lakes busway station and are operated by Brisbane Transport. Three of these routes travel to/from Brisbane City further north, via either the Woolloongabba busway station, the RBWH busway station, or Highgate Hill and West End - the latter route is the only one to enter/exit the Eastern Busway at Dutton Park Place, rather than continuing to/from Boggo Road busway station.

The other three routes reach outer Brisbane, travelling either to/from the easterly Carindale bus station, or the southerly Eight Mile Plains busway station or Sunnybank Hills.

References

External links
[ Dutton Park Place station] TransLink

Bus stations in Brisbane
Dutton Park, Queensland
Transport infrastructure completed in 2009